Raajjiyam is a 2002 Indian Tamil-language action film directed and produced by Manoj Kumar. The film stars Vijayakanth, Dileep, Shamita Shetty and Priyanka Trivedi. The music was composed by Bharadwaj. The film was released on 12 April 2002, it received mixed reviews and became a commercial failure. 
The film marked the debut of Malayalam actor Dileep in Tamil cinema.

Plot
Karthikeyan runs a Central Government-authorized Secret Service agency called "Jothi Security Force" under the guise of an organization that helps people arriving in Chennai. He leads a happy life with his wife Geetha, daughter Pooja, and younger brother Surya, a mute. Surya falls in love with Anuradha, a woman that Karthikeyan brings home from the railway station, but her past forces her to reject his romance. When the governor's daughter-in-law dies, Karthikeyan finds out that it was a murder and arrests the governor's son Kiran Kumar. Though the governor congratulates Karthikeyan and appoints him as his personal bodyguard, he is plotting his revenge on him. The innocent Surya is then arrested during a riot. In jail, Inspector Kabilan, who hates Karthikeyan after being humiliated by him and works for the governor, tortures Surya. Kabilan later swaps Kiran Kumar and Surya: Surya gets hooked in jail and Kiran Kumar is secretly released from jail. Karthikeyan eventually discovers the plot and takes revenge by killing Kabilan and the governor.

Cast

Vijayakanth as Karthikeyan
Dileep as Surya
Shamita Shetty as Geetha Karthikeyan
Priyanka Trivedi as Anuradha
Vadivelu as Sengalvarayan (Sengal)
Murali as Governor
Anand as Governor's son
Ponnambalam as Ponnambalam
Janakaraj as Governor's PA
Senthil
Mansoor Ali Khan as Inspector Kabilan
Baby Akshaya as Pooja
Rocky as Terrorist
Singamuthu as Convict
Pandu as Security Officer
Mohan Sharma as Deputy Commissioner of Police
Lavanya as Janaki
Usharani as Janaki's mother
Peeli Sivam as Anuradha's father
Vijay Easwaran as Easwar
Kallukkul Eeram Ramanathan as Ramanathan
Kalidoss as Jayapal
Lekhasri as Sneha, Sengalvarayan's lover
Besant Ravi as Henchman
Kottai Perumal as Man at the railway station
Manivannan in a special appearance

Production
The fight scene between Vijayakanth and Ponnamabalam was taken on a revolving bamboo, with the two men standing on either edge, the scene choreographed by Super Subbarayan. For the set, 20 lorries carrying bamboos were brought in, and set designer Shanmugham arranged them in order to make the place look like a bamboo fortress. It took twelve days to shoot the scene, and canning the shots was Kartikraja. The film was produced at a cost of 7 crore.

Soundtrack

The music was composed by Bharadwaj, and lyrics were written by Snehan.

Critical reception
Rediff wrote:"Though the film created expectations as a political thriller with Vijaykanth spewing dialogues laden with political nuances, Raajjiyam is about brothers, laced with action sequences". Malathi Rangarajan of The Hindu wrote "Guru Films' 'Rajjiyam' has characters that lack depth and situations that lack verve. Manoj Kumar's screenplay and direction leave much to be desired."

References

External links
 

2002 films
2000s Tamil-language films
Films scored by Bharadwaj (composer)